Ahura Mazda and Ardashir I is a rock relief from Sasanian Persia. It is also known as The inscription of Ardashir-e Babakan and Hormozd or Coronation of Ardashir-e Babakan. This relief was carved around 235 which makes it one of the oldest Sasanian rock reliefs. The relief is well-preserved and is mostly unharmed. It is located in the east corner of Naqsh-e Rostam and was carved 2 meters above the ground. The relief has 6.65m width and 2.40m height.

The inscription shows Ardashir I's coronation ceremony in which he receives his kingship seal from Ahura Mazda (or Hormozd) and Ahura Mazda appoints him as the Shahanshah of Ērānshahr. Ardashir I and Ahuramazda are both on horseback, facing each other. In this scene, Ardashir receives the kingship ring from Ahuramazda. The man behind Ahuramazda on the left side of the relief is the high priest Kartir. Ardashir's horse is trampling Artabanus V, the last king of Parthian Empire also Ahura Mazda horse is trampling the devil's dead body.

Inscription
There's an inscription on Ardashir's horse in three languages: Middle Persian, Parthian and Greek. The inscription reads as "This is the figure of Mazdaworshiper, the lord Ardashir, Shahanshah of Iran, whose lineage is from Gods, the son of the lord Papak, the king". There's also another inscription on Ahuramazda's horse in aforementioned languages. The Greek version of this inscription reads as "This is the figure of the God Zeus", whereas the Middle Persian version reads as "This is the figure of the God Ahuramazda".

This inscription seems to be the oldest inscription from the Sasanian period. Above the Ahura Mazda's figure, there's another three small inscriptions in the aforementioned languages with same content, which reads as "This is Ahura Mazda's (bagh) figure".

References

Sources
 Persian wikipedia

Archaeological sites in Iran
Sasanian inscriptions
Ardashir I
Greek inscriptions
Rock reliefs in Iran
Parthian language